Gaalipata 2 is a 2022 Indian Kannada-language romantic comedy film written and directed by Yogaraj Bhat. Not a sequel to 2008 Kannada film, Gaalipata, it features an ensemble cast consisting of Ganesh, Anant Nag, Diganth, Pawan Kumar, Vaibhavi Shandilya, Samyuktha Menon and Sharmiela Mandre.

Ganesh and Bhat were collaborating for the fourth time with this film, while it will be the fifth film for Diganth with the director. Director Pawan Kumar of Lucia fame, who has worked with Bhat earlier as a screenwriter and an actor in Manasaare (2009) and Pancharangi (2010) will also be facing the camera. It was released in theaters on 12 August 2022.
 Subsequently it was released for OTT on October 5, 2022 through ZEE5.

Premise 
Gani, Mugilpete Diganth and Bhushan are college friends, who return to Neer Kote, Malnad to visit their ailing Kannada teacher Kishore Meshtru. Kishore seeks the trio's help to search for his longlost  son Revanth aka Appu. How does the trio help Meshtru in finding Appu forms the crux of the plot.

Cast
 Ganesh as Gani
 Anant Nag as Kishore aka Meshtru
 Diganth as Mugilpete Diganth 
 Pawan Kumar as Bhushan
 Vaibhavi Shandilya as Swetha
 Samyuktha as Anupama
 Sharmiela Mandre as Sharmila
 Rangayana Raghu as Bhairegowda, Gani's Father
 Sudha Belawadi as Kumuda, Gani's Mother
 Prakash Thuminad as Ramanna
 Srinath as Neerkote College Principal
 Padmaja Rao as Padmaja, Kumuda's Friend
 Nishvika Naidu as Nishvika (Cameo)
 Vijay Suriya as Revantha aka Appu (Cameo)
 Vihaan Ganesh as Young Appu and Revantha's Son (Cameo)
 Bullet Prakash (Cameo)
 Jayant Kaikini (Cameo)

Production
The film will be produced by Ramesh Reddy of Suraj Production. The cinematography will be done by Santhosh Rai Pathaje and the music was composed by Arjun Janya. The team started shooting on 2 December 2019, and had completed a major chunk of the shooting in and around Kudremukh over almost 30 days. Further production schedules were delayed due to COVID-19. Filming completed in October 2021.

Soundtrack

Release

Theatrical
The film was theatrically released on 12 August 2022.

Home media
The satellite and digital streaming rights of the film were acquired by Zee Kannada and ZEE5.

Reception

Box-office
The film did a pre-release business of around ₹8 crore by the sale of digital, satellite and audio rights. The movie earned approximately ₹15 crore to ₹18 crore  to ₹20 crore on the first day. The movie collected ₹10 crore on Day 2. The movie collected ₹5 crore each on Day 3 & Day 4 - taking the total gross of 35 crore.

References

External links
 
Galipata 2 on ZEE5

2020s Kannada-language films
Films shot in Bangalore
Films shot in Karnataka
Comedy-drama
Films directed by Yogaraj Bhat